Ettore Meini (5 January 1903 – 29 August 1961) was an Italian professional road bicycle racer. Meini has won 5 stages in the Giro d'Italia, and one stage in the 1934 Tour de France.

Major results

1928
Coppa Cavacciocchi
1929
Coppa Zucchi
1930
Coppa Cavacciocchi
1931
Giro d'Italia:
Winner stage 6
Giro dell'Umbria
Giro della Romagna
1932
Giro d'Italia:
Winner stages 10 and 12
Milano - La Spezia
1933
Giro d'Italia:
Winner stages 14 and 15
1934
Tour de France:
Winner stage 19

References

External links 

Official Tour de France results for Ettore Meini

Italian male cyclists
1903 births
1961 deaths
Italian Tour de France stage winners
Cyclists from Tuscany
Sportspeople from the Province of Pisa